Hugh Harman and Rudolf Ising were an American animation team and company known for founding the Warner Bros. and Metro-Goldwyn-Mayer animation studios. In 1929, the studio was founded under the name "Harman-Ising Productions", producing Looney Tunes and Merrie Melodies for Leon Schlesinger from 1930 to 1933.  From 1933 to 1938, Harman-Ising produced the Happy Harmonies series, also working with William Hanna.

Early history 
Harman and Ising first worked in animation in 1922 at Laugh-O-Gram Studio, Walt Disney's studio in Kansas City. When Disney moved operations to California, Harman was back at United Film Ad Service and Ising had a photofinishing business. Their plans went nowhere, however, and the men soon came back to Disney on June 22, 1925 to work on his Alice Comedies and Oswald the Lucky Rabbit films. Ising was fired from Disney in March of 1927, when Disney signed the contract to distribute Oswald films to Universal Pictures. It was during this time that Harman and Ising developed a style of cartoon drawing that would later be closely associated with, and credited to, Disney.

When producer Charles Mintz ended his association with Disney, Harman and Ising went to work for Mintz, whose brother-in-law, George Winkler, set up a new animation studio to make the Oswald cartoons. The Oswald cartoons which Harman and Ising produced in 1928 and 1929 already show their distinctive style, which would later characterize their work on the Looney Tunes and Merrie Melodies cartoon series for Warner Bros. Late in 1929, Universal Pictures who owned the rights to Oswald, started its own animation studio headed by Walter Lantz, replacing Mintz and forcing Harman and Ising out of work.

Warner Bros. and Van Beuren 

Harman and Ising had long aspired to start their own studio, and had created and copyrighted the cartoon character Bosko in 1928. After losing their jobs at the Winkler studio, Harman and Ising financed a short Bosko demonstration film called Bosko, the Talk-Ink Kid. The cartoon featured Bosko at odds with his animator – portrayed in live-action by Rudy Ising. Impressed, Leon Schlesinger, who worked at Warner Bros., hired Harman and Ising. Schlesinger wanted the Bosko character to star in a new series of cartoons he dubbed Looney Tunes (the title being a parody of Walt Disney's Silly Symphonies). The pair made Sinkin' in the Bathtub in 1930, and the cartoon did well. Harman took over direction of the Looney Tunes starring the character, while Ising took a sister series called Merrie Melodies that consisted of one-shot stories and characters.

The two animators broke off ties with Schlesinger later in 1933 over budget disputes with the producer who had vetoed their demands for bigger budgets, and went to Van Beuren Studios, which was making cartoons for RKO Radio Pictures. There, they were offered a contract to produce the Cubby Bear cartoon series. Harman and Ising produced two released cartoons for this series, but were in the midst of making a third cartoon when a contractual dispute arose. The pair left Van Beuren, but kept the completed cartoon and finally released it in the 1940s.

Metro-Goldwyn-Mayer 
 
Harman and Ising had maintained the rights to the Bosko character, and they signed a deal with Metro-Goldwyn-Mayer to start a new series of Bosko shorts in 1934. The two maintained the same division of work they had used at Warner Bros.: Harman worked on Bosko shorts, and Ising directed one-shots. They also tried unsuccessfully to create new cartoon stars for their new distributors. Their cartoons, though technically superior to those they had made for Schlesinger at Warner's, were still music-driven shorts with little to no plot. When the new Happy Harmonies series ran significantly over-budget in 1937, MGM fired Harman and Ising and established its own in-house studio,  the Metro-Goldwyn-Mayer cartoon studio, which was founded and headed by Fred Quimby.

Harman and Ising still found work at the time as animation freelancers. Harman and Ising lent their former ink-and-painters to Walt Disney while Snow White and the Seven Dwarfs was behind schedule. Disney afterward commissioned Harman and Ising to produce a Silly Symphony cartoon, Merbabies, in return. Disney later reneged on a deal he had made for two other Harman-Ising cartoons to be produced for the studio, as RKO Radio Pictures, Disney's Distributor, did not want to release another studio's cartoons. Harman and Ising sold the cartoons to MGM, and Quimby later agreed to hire the animators back to the studio. Ising created the character Barney Bear for MGM at this time, basing the sleepy-eyed character partially on himself. 

In 1939, Harman created Peace on Earth, a downbeat morality tale about two squirrels discovering the evils of humanity, which was nominated for an Oscar. The following year, Ising produced William Hanna and Joseph Barbera's first cartoon, Puss Gets the Boot, a cartoon featuring characters later known as Tom and Jerry, but according to Barbera, Ising never came into the room, but got credited. Despite the popularity of Puss Gets the Boot, Ising's The Milky Way was more successful and became the first non-Disney film to win the Academy Award. Despite the success of these and other cartoons, MGM's production under Harman and Ising remained low.

In 1941, Harman left MGM and formed a new studio with Disney veteran Mel Shaw, while Ising was still at MGM. In 1942, Ising also quit MGM, in his case to join the United States Army Air Forces animation unit.

Later career and legacy 
By 1951, Harman and Ising were back together and making industrial and commercial films such as the 1951 film "Good Wrinkles" made for the California prune industry. Harman also freelanced to write the 1954 Woody Woodpecker Cartune "Convict Concerto" for his former colleague Walter Lantz. 

In 1960, Harman-Ising produced a pilot episode for a made for TV cartoon series titled The Adventures of Sir Gee Whiz on the Other Side of the Moon.  The unsold pilot for the never produced series was profiled on episode 6 of Cartoon Dump.  Rudy Ising was the voice of Sir Gee Whiz. After Gee-Whiz, the studio closed permanently.

Although Harman and Ising contributed to much of what would later be known as the Disney style, they have been dismissed as mere copycats. In reality, Harman and Ising never attempted to imitate Disney; they were attempting to make refined polished cartoons whose quality would shine in comparison to the work of others. Their repeated attempts to make quality cartoons and their refusal to be bound by budgets led to numerous disputes with their producers. Because of this, they were unable to create any enduring characters.  Instead, they created studios that would later produce such characters.

Ising and Harman were portrayed in the feature film Walt Before Mickey by David Henrie and Hunter Gomez.

References

External links 
 Hugh Harman educational health series

Animation duos
Walt Disney Animation Studios people
Warner Bros. Cartoons people
Metro-Goldwyn-Mayer cartoon studio people
Articles containing video clips
Laugh-O-Gram Studio people
American companies established in 1929
American companies disestablished in 1960